Libertador is one of the 13 municipalities of the state of Monagas, Venezuela. The municipality's capital is Temblador.

Geography 
Libertador Municipality is located to the southwest of Monagas State. Its vegetation is tropical dry forest, with average annual temperature of 27.1°C and average annual precipitation of 1,000 mm. Among the main watercourses are Caño Mánamo and the Morichal Largo River.

Economy 
The economy is based on agriculture and forestry (primarily pine plantations).

Culture 

The indigenous Warao people live in Libertador Municipality. They speak Warao, an agglutinative language isolate.

Cuisine 
A typical dish of this region is Soup of Ocumo, prepared with banana, jojoto and leaf sprouts of ocumo (Xanthosoma).

Public holidays 
On September 8, the region celebrates the day of the Virgin of the Valley, patron of the east of Venezuela.

Mayor 
 Miguel Presilla (2017 - 2021) PCV.

References

Municipalities of Monagas